FBP may refer to:

 Fábrica de Braço de Prata, a defunct Portuguese weapons manufacturer
 FBP submachine gun
 FBP: Federal Bureau of Physics, an American comic book series
 Federal Bureau of Prisons
 Film and Publication Board, is a content-classification and censorship authority in South Africa
 Filtered back projection, an analytic tomographic image reconstruction algorithm
 First BanCorp, a Puerto Rican financial holding company
 Fixed book price agreement
 Flow-based programming
 Fluff Busting Purity, a web browser extension
 Folate-binding protein
 Fructose 1,6-bisphosphate
 Fructose 1,6-bisphosphatase
 Funds for Endangered Parrots, a German conservation organization
 Progressive Citizens' Party, a political party in Liechtenstein